is the sixteenth single by Japanese girl group Melon Kinenbi. It was the first of Melon Kinenbi's singles to be produced by Sharam Q member Taisei. It was released on March 28, 2007, and its highest position on the Oricon weekly chart was #16.

Track listing

External links
Unforgettable at the Up-Front Works release list (Japanese)

2007 singles
Zetima Records singles
2007 songs
Song articles with missing songwriters